Gijs Vermeulen (born 7 May 1981 in Amsterdam) is a rower from the Netherlands.

His career highlight so far was in Athens at the 2004 Summer Olympics where he won the silver medal in the eights together with Michiel Bartman, Geert-Jan Derksen, Gerritjan Eggenkamp, Daniël Mensch, Diederik Simon, Matthijs Vellenga, Jan-Willem Gabriëls and Chun Wei Cheung.

After the Olympics Vermeulen, Vellenga, Gabriëls and Geert Cirkel started a new mission on the road to the 2008 Summer Olympics in Beijing with the fours. Their formation was successful straight away with a second place in the 2005 Luzern World Cup as well as the World Championships in Gifu that year. In 2006 they got another second place in Luzern and a third in Munich. In Eton where the World Championships were held they won another bronze medal. They were the team to beat in 2007 after winning the World Cup in Luzern and becoming second in both Amsterdam and Linz. However at the 2007 World Championships in Munich they had to be satisfied with another bronze medal. With a World Cup win in Poznań and a second place in Luzern in 2008, they qualified for the 2008 Summer Olympics.

References

1981 births
Living people
Dutch male rowers
Rowers at the 2004 Summer Olympics
Rowers at the 2008 Summer Olympics
Olympic rowers of the Netherlands
Olympic silver medalists for the Netherlands
Rowers from Amsterdam
Olympic medalists in rowing
Medalists at the 2004 Summer Olympics
World Rowing Championships medalists for the Netherlands